Kraan is a German band based in Ulm and formed in 1970. It had several minor hits through the 1970s and 1980s.  After a break of ten years, the group reunited in 2000.  Their early style can be described as Krautrock that turned later to fusion, combining elements of both rock and jazz.

Members

Current line-up
Peter Wolbrandt – guitar (1970–present)
Hellmut Hattler – bass guitar (1970–present)
Jan Fride – drums (1970–1978, 1984–present)

Former members
 – keyboards (1975–2007; died 2019)
Johannes Pappert – alto sax (1970–1976)
Udo Dahmen – drums (1977–1980)
 – keyboards, trumpet (1987–1992)
Gerry Brown – drums, lead vocals (1979–1983)
Tomy Goldschmidt – drums (1977)
Eef Albers – guitar (1982–1983)
Marc McMillen – keyboards, vocals (1982–1983)

Timeline

Discography

Studioalbums
1972 Kraan
1973 Wintrup
1974 Andy Nogger
1975 Let It Out
1977 Wiederhören
1978 Flyday
1982 Nachtfahrt
1983 X 
1989 Dancing In The Shade
1991 Soul of Stone
2003 Through
2007 Psychedelic man
2010 Diamonds
2020 Sandglass

Live albums
1975 Kraan Live (2lp)
1980 Tournee
1988 Kraan Live 88
2001 Live 2001
2018 The Trio Years
2019 The Trio Years - Zugabe
2020 Finkenbach Festival 2005

Compilations
1976 Starportrait (2lp)
1983 2 Platten (Best of Kraan) (2lp)
1998 The Famous Years Compiled
2001 Berliner Ring (Demos and live recordings)

External links

Musical groups established in 1970
Krautrock musical groups
German progressive rock groups
German experimental musical groups
Inside Out Music artists